The PoolParty Semantic Suite is a technology platform provided by the Semantic Web Company. The EU-based company belongs to the early pioneers of the Semantic Web movement (Reference). The software supports enterprises in knowledge management, data analytics and content organisation. The product uses standards-based technologies as defined by W3C, which prevents vendor lock-in (Reference). Reference customers are among others Boehringer Ingelheim, Credit Suisse, European Commission, REEEP, Wolters Kluwer and the World Bank Group.

History 
The PoolParty Semantic Suite is commercialising Semantic Web technologies. In 2009, the first release of the PoolParty Semantic Software entered the market. Since then, the product has evolved from a taxonomy management tool to a feature-rich semantic software platform that enables companies to deploy enterprise knowledge graphs to integrate structured and unstructured data. The product is developing fast due to a strong R&D focus and is integral part of multiple EU research projects of the Horizon 2020 initiative ( Reference, Reference).

Product 
The PoolParty Semantic Suite is a modular and flexible software package. It differentiates nine modules, which can be individually combined depending on the business challenge:
 Taxonomy & Thesaurus Management 
 Text Mining & Entity Extraction 
 Ontology Management
 Concept Tagging
 Data Integration 
 Linked Data Management 
 Semantic Search 
 Recommender System
 Analytics & Visualization
Content assets get semantically enriched and are put into context by being matched against a knowledge graph. This is the foundation for semantic applications as search or linked data portals.

Technologies 

PoolParty Semantic Suite is deploying Semantic Web technologies as promoted by W3C. The backbone of the information architecture is built by applying SKOS (Simple Knowledge Organization System), ontologies and Linked Data principles. Any data processed within PoolParty is transformed into RDF graphs and can be queried with SPARQL.

An essential advantage of this approach is that taxonomy projects developed in PoolParty can be linked with data from virtually any repository. Companies benefit from an automatic entity linking between resources from the graph-based semantic layer and knowledge assets from data repositories like document management systems.

Critics argue that the technology hasn't yet become mainstream as it is relative complex. As the demand and requirements for smarter enterprise applications are undamped, the Semantic Web technology stack becomes continuously more attractive to developers.

Awards and recognition 
Semantic Web Company's (SWC) Information Security Management Systems have been certified according to the standard ISO 27001:2013 (Certificate)

Gartner calls PoolParty ‘a representative product’ in its 2018 market guide for ‘Hosted AI Services’. (Reference)

Gartner Names PoolParty as Visionary in 2020 Magic Quadrant for Metadata Management Solutions. (Reference)

MarkLogic has announced Semantic Web Company's PoolParty with Partner Excellence in Technology (Reference)

In 2017, 2018, 2019 and 2020 KMWorld named Semantic Web Company as 1 of 100 companies that matter in knowledge management (Reference)

In 2015, 2016 and 2017 KMWorld named PoolParty Semantic Suite as a trend-setting product.

In 2016 KMWorld named Semantic Web Company as 1 of 100 companies that matter in knowledge management (Reference)

ZDNet writes about "What IBM, the Semantic Web Company, and Siemens are doing with semantic technologies"

2016.SEMANTiCS  writes about "How to develop aligned, quality-centric semantic software - Gold Sponsor Aligned Project"

Dataversity writes about "PoolParty Releases Enhanced Version of its Semantic Middleware"

KMWorld writes about "PoolParty Introduces Machine Learning Capabilities to its Platform"

KMWorld writes about "Why Enterprises should embrace Taxonomies and Knowledge Graphs"

KMWorld writes about "Knowledge graph management and text analytics from Semantic Web Company"

KMWorld writes about "Taxonomy 101: The Basics and Getting Started with Taxonomies"

References 

Acknowledgement W3C
PoolParty Semantic Suite and Semantic Web technologies
Realizing thesaurus based uses cases with the PoolParty Suite
PoolParty 6.0 brings the Most Complete Semantic Middleware to the Global Market!
PoolParty Enhances Semantic Middleware with Release 6
PoolParty Product Test Review by Europeana
PoolParty Research Papers

External links 
 Official Product Website 
 Corporate Website

Java platform software
Natural language processing software
Semantic Web
Ontology editors